Gholamreza Heydari is an Iranian engineer, academic and reformist politician who is currently a member of the Parliament of Iran representing Tehran, Rey, Shemiranat and Eslamshahr electoral district. He formerly represented Tafresh County, where he originally comes from.

His son, Hadi Heydari, is a famous editorial cartoonist in Iran.

Career 
Heydari is a professor and was formerly dean of School of Management and Economy at the Power and Water University of Technology. He was formerly advisor to the Minister of Power and is a fellow at Niroo Research Institute, the ministry's research arm.

On 17 December 2019, Heydari criticized Iranian authorities for carrying out shootings of protesters during the 2019–20 Iranian protests. He also criticized Present Hassan Rouhani for his decision to increase gas prices, saying that the move "dealt a heavy blow at the social capital of the Islamic Republic.”

Electoral history

References

1955 births
Living people
People from Tafresh
Islamic Iran Participation Front politicians
NEDA Party politicians
Members of the 2nd Islamic Consultative Assembly
Members of the 3rd Islamic Consultative Assembly
Members of the 10th Islamic Consultative Assembly